Elon Musk, one of the richest men in the world and the CEO of Tesla, has expressed many views on a wide variety of subjects, ranging from politics to science.

Within the context of American politics, Musk has described himself as being politically moderate. Musk supported George W. Bush in 2004, Barack Obama in 2008 and 2012, Hillary Clinton in 2016, and Joe Biden in 2020. In 2022, Musk said he would start voting for Republican Party candidates. He has stated support for universal basic income, gun rights, freedom of speech, a tax on carbon emissions and opposes government subsidies.

Musk is also a prominent critic of short-selling. Musk has expressed concern about issues such as artificial intelligence, climate change and population decline. He has also criticized COVID-19 lockdowns, public transportation, and labor unions.

Politics

Canada convoy protest
On January 27, 2022, Musk tweeted "Canadian truckers rule", endorsing the Canada convoy protest, branded as the "Freedom Convoy" by its organizers. Musk tweeted extensively in support of the protest, which began as a denunciation of COVID-19 vaccine mandates for truck drivers crossing the Canada-U.S. border, but morphed into being against COVID-19 restrictions in general and Canada's Liberal government.

On February 16, 2022, apparently supporting the protest, Musk tweeted and later deleted a meme comparing Canadian prime minister Justin Trudeau to Adolf Hitler. Trudeau's government had recently invoked the Emergencies Act to cut funding to the convoy protest, which was founded and internationally funded by far-right activists. The Auschwitz-Birkenau State Museum accused Musk of exploiting the tragedy of the Holocaust, and the American Jewish Committee asked Musk to apologize.

Donald Trump
In July 2022, Donald Trump alleged that Musk had told him he voted for him in 2016, referred to him as a "bullshit artist", and called Musk's contract with Twitter "rotten". Musk denied telling Trump that he had voted for him, said it is "time for Trump to hang up his hat & sail into the sunset" and said that Trump would be "too old to be chief executive of anything, let alone the United States of America." Afterwards, Trump said on Truth Social that "When Elon Musk came to the White House asking me for help on all of his many subsidized projects, whether it's electric cars that don't drive long enough, driverless cars that crash, or rocketships to nowhere, without which subsidies he'd be worthless, and telling me how he was a big Trump fan and Republican, I could have said, 'drop to your knees and beg,' and he would have done it". Trump also said on Truth Social that "Now Elon should focus on getting himself out of the Twitter mess because he could owe $44 billion for something that's perhaps worthless. Also, lots of competition for electric cars!". Afterwards, Musk tweeted "Lmaooo" in response to another Twitter user who posted a screenshot of Trump's comments and responded with a GIF of Grampa Simpson yelling at clouds.

Free speech
In 2022, Musk refused to block Russian state media on SpaceX's Starlink satellites in response to Russia's invasion of Ukraine, calling himself "a free speech absolutist." On April 14, 2022, Musk made an offer to buy Twitter, saying "I invested in Twitter as I believe in its potential to be the platform for free speech around the globe, and I believe free speech is a societal imperative for a functioning democracy".

Musk praised the popularity of Donald Trump's social media platform Truth Social, and stated that it "exists because Twitter censored free speech". Trump created the alt-tech platform after Twitter banned him for inciting violence following the 2021 United States Capitol attack. On May 10, 2022, Musk called Twitter's decision to ban Trump "morally wrong", and said that he will reverse Trump's ban when he buys Twitter. On November 19, 2022, following a Twitter poll which resulted in 51.8% voting in favor of reversing the ban, he unbanned Trump.

In November 2022, Musk tweeted that he was so committed to free speech that he would not ban @ElonJet, a Twitter account that tracked the publicly available real-time flight data of Musk's private plane. Musk reversed his position the next month, banning the account and several journalists who had reported on it, accusing them of doxxing. He also announced that he would take legal action against @ElonJet.

Gender pronouns

In July 2020, Musk tweeted "Pronouns suck"—inferred by media outlets to reference preferred gender pronouns—which was perceived by some as transphobic and an attack on non-binary identities. In December 2020, Musk criticized preferred gender pronouns in online profiles. In response to critical backlash, Musk stated, "I absolutely support trans, but all these pronouns are an esthetic nightmare." LGBT rights advocacy group Human Rights Campaign, which had ranked Tesla number one on its Corporate Equality Index, criticized his tweets and called for an apology. In December 2022, Musk again mocked pronouns, tweeting "My pronouns are Prosecute/Fauci". Charlie Warzel of The Atlantic stated that this tweet reveals Musk as a far-right activist.

Gun rights
In the aftermath of the 2022 Robb Elementary School shooting, Musk said that he supports "tight background checks" on all gun purchases. He also said that he supports limiting the sale of assault rifles to those living in "high risk" locations with issues such as "gang warfare" and to owners of gun ranges, adding that "Assault rifles should at minimum require a special permit, where the recipient is extremely well vetted". However, Musk said that he "strongly" believed "that the right to bear arms is an important safeguard against potential tyranny of government. Historically, maintaining their power over the people is why those in power did not allow public ownership of guns".

Political parties and the US in general

In 2014, Musk described himself politically as "half Democrat, half Republican" and "I'm somewhere in the middle, socially liberal and fiscally conservative." In 2018, he stated that he was "not a conservative. I'm registered independent [and] politically moderate." He stated in 2022 that he had "voted overwhelmingly for Democrats, historically" but intended to vote Republican in an upcoming election.

Prompted by the emergence of artificial intelligence, Musk has voiced support for a universal basic income; he additionally backs direct democracy and has stated he thinks the government on Mars will be a direct democracy. He has described himself as a "socialist" but "not the kind that shifts resources from most productive to least productive"; he later clarified not to take this tweet too seriously. He supports targeting an inclusive tax rate of 40%, prefers consumption taxes to income taxes, and supports the estate tax, as the "probability of progeny being equally excellent at capital allocation is not high."

In an interview with The Washington Post, Musk stated he was a "significant (though not top-tier) donor to Democrats", but that he also gives heavily to Republicans. Musk further stated that political contributions are a requirement in order to have a voice in the United States government. A 2012 report from the Sunlight Foundation, a nonpartisan group that tracks government spending, found that since 2002, SpaceX had spent more than $4 million on lobbying the United States Congress and more than $800,000 in political contributions to Democrats and Republicans. As for Musk specifically, the same report said that "SpaceX's campaign to win political support has been systematic and sophisticated," and that "unlike most tech-startups, SpaceX has maintained a significant lobbying presence in Washington almost since day1." and that "Musk himself has donated roughly $725,000 to various campaigns since 2002. In 2004, he contributed $2,000 to President George W. Bush's reelection campaign, maxing out (over $100,000) to Barack Obama's reelection campaign and donated $5,000 to Republican Sen. Marco Rubio, who represents Florida, a state critical to the space industry. [...] All told, Musk and SpaceX gave out roughly $250,000 in the 2012 election cycle."

Musk has described the United States as "[inarguably] the greatest country that has ever existed on Earth," describing it as "the greatest force for good of any country that's ever been." Musk believes democracy would not exist any longer if not for the United States, saying that it prevented this disappearance on three occasions through its participation in World War I, World War II, and the Cold War. Musk also stated that he thinks "it would be a mistake to say the United States is perfect, it certainly is not. There have been many foolish things the United States has done and bad things the United States has done."

In September 2021, in response to Texas Governor Greg Abbott saying that Musk supported Texas' "social policies", Musk tweeted "In general, I believe government should rarely impose its will upon the people, and, when doing so, should aspire to maximize their cumulative happiness" and "That said, I would prefer to stay out of politics".

In November 2021, Musk was criticized after mocking US Senator Bernie Sanders on Twitter. Sanders posted a message on Twitter saying "We must demand that the extremely wealthy pay their fair share. Period." Musk then replied: "I keep forgetting that you're still alive."

Race
In February 2023, following racist comments from cartoonist Scott Adams in which he described Black people as a hate group and encouraged racial segregation, Musk accused the media of reverse racism for their response and agreed with a tweet saying that there was an element of truth to Adams' comments.

US presidents and presidential candidates
Before the election of Donald Trump as President of the United States, Musk criticized Trump by saying: "I feel a bit stronger that he is probably not the right guy. He doesn't seem to have the sort of character that reflects well on the United States." Following Trump's inauguration, Musk expressed approval of Trump's choice of Rex Tillerson as Secretary of State and accepted an invitation to participate in two councils advising the president. Regarding his cooperation with Trump, Musk subsequently commented: "The more voices of reason that the President hears, the better." He resigned from both business advisory councils in June 2017 after only a few months, in protest of Trump's decision to withdraw the United States from the Paris Agreement on climate change, stating: "Climate change is real. Leaving Paris is not good for America or the world". In January 2017, Musk criticized Trump's travel ban, saying "The blanket entry ban on citizens from certain primarily Muslim countries is not the best way to address the country's challenges". In May 2020, amidst Musk's restarting of Tesla assembly plant production during the COVID-19 pandemic, Trump tweeted in support of Musk, which Musk welcomed and publicly thanked him for on Twitter.

In August 2019, tweeted in support of the 2020 Democratic presidential candidate Andrew Yang, whose platform revolved around job displacement caused by automation and AI. Musk said in a tweet that universal basic income, which Yang supports, is "obviously needed". Musk went on to voice support for Kanye West's independent run for president in July 2020.

In September 2021, following the launch of Inspiration4, Musk mocked President Joe Biden when asked why Biden had not yet congratulated the SpaceX mission and its civilian crew.

Musk voted for Hillary Clinton in the 2016 U.S. presidential election and voted for Joe Biden in the 2020 U.S. presidential election. In May 2022, Musk said that he could "no longer support" the Democrats and would be voting Republican instead due to Biden's support for unions and his inability to "get a lot done". In June 2022, Musk voted for Mayra Flores in a special election, stating it was the first time he ever voted Republican. In a November 2022, Musk stated in a tweet that he would support Ron DeSantis in the 2024 United States presidential election if he chose to run.

Women in technology
In October 2021, Musk joked on Twitter that he would start a new university named "Texas Institute of Technology & Science", which corresponds to the acronym TITS, "tits" being slang for women's breasts. Musk added, "it will have epic merch, universally admired".

Cher Scarlett, a software engineer and one of the leaders of the AppleToo anti-harassment group at Apple, accused Musk of contributing to a systemic problem where women in technology companies are being sexualized by male colleagues, originating from executives at the top influencing the company culture downwards. Jessica Barraza, a Tesla production associate who filed a lawsuit for sexual harassment incidents that were corroborated by The Washington Post, said that Tesla's male-majority workplace culture—described in the lawsuit as resembling an archaic construction site or frat house, with frequent groping on the factory floor—is bred at the top of the company; she cited Musk's "tits" tweet as setting an example for workers at the Tesla factory that is unfair to women who work there.

International relations

Bolivia
In July 2020, Musk tweeted, "We will coup whoever we want! Deal with it" in response to a Twitter user who implied that the US government organized a coup (referring to the 2019 Bolivian political crisis) against Evo Morales for Musk to obtain lithium from Bolivia. Musk's tweet caused controversy and was later deleted.

China
Musk has been described as having a "charm offensive" to woo China and its markets for Tesla. On the 100th anniversary of the founding of the Chinese Communist Party, Musk praised the state's "economic prosperity".

Russian invasion of Ukraine

On 3 October 2022, Musk floated a controversial proposal on Twitter, arguing that Ukraine should permanently cede Crimea to Russia, and that Ukraine should drop its bid to join NATO. The four-part proposal, posted as a Twitter poll, suggested new referendums under UN supervision on the annexation of Russia-occupied territories. The proposal was welcomed by the Russian government and denounced by Ukrainian President Volodymyr Zelenskyy as "pro-Russia", with officials noting that people who had been murdered or forcibly deported by Russia would be unable to vote.

Musk appeared to be "transmitting a message" for Putin, according to foreign affairs specialist Fiona Hill. In an email newsletter, Ian Bremmer, head of Eurasia Group, a political-risk consultancy, also said that Musk told him that he had spoken directly with Russian President Vladimir Putin, which Musk denied in a reply on Twitter. Musk claimed he had spoken to Putin only once 18 months prior, on a space-related subject matter. Bremmer later took to Twitter to say Musk had told him of the discussion with Putin two weeks earlier. Kremlin spokesman Dmitry Peskov called it "untrue", claiming Musk and Putin had only spoken about a year and a half before.

In Hill's interview with Politico, she said that Musk's suggestion that Kherson and Zaporizhzhia be up for negotiation, and that the water supply for Crimea be secured, was "so specific that this clearly is a message from Putin". Musk previously made a similar suggestion at a September event in Aspen, Colorado. Hill told Politico, "Putin plays the egos of big men, gives them a sense that they can play a role. But in reality, they're just direct transmitters of messages from Vladimir Putin".

Musk's SpaceX later took steps to limit Starlink usage in Ukraine, prompting a presidential adviser to comment that companies had to decide if they were “on the side of the right to freedom” or “on the Russian Federation’s side and its ‘right’ to kill and seize territories”.

Notably, the Logan Act prohibits private citizens from conducting foreign affairs without the U.S. government's permission or involvement, however only two people have ever been prosecuted under the act, both in the 19th century, and neither was convicted.

Taiwan 
In October 2022, Musk suggested that Taiwan should become "a special administrative zone" of China with an "arrangement that's more lenient than Hong Kong." during an interview with the Financial Times. The proposal drew cross-party criticism from Taiwanese lawmakers.  of the Democratic Progressive Party posted on Facebook that "Musk's solution is all about victim concessions." Chinese Ambassador to the United States Qin Gang thanked Musk for his suggestion, while representative of Taiwan to the United States Hsiao Bi-khim said that "our freedom and democracy are not for sale." Shortly after Musk's comments, China gave Tesla a tax break.

Science and technology

Artificial intelligence 
Musk has frequently spoken about the potential dangers of artificial intelligence, calling it "the most serious threat to the survival of the human race". During a 2014 interview at the MIT AeroAstro Centennial Symposium, Musk described AI as humanity's largest existential threat, further stating, "I'm increasingly inclined to think that there should be some regulatory oversight, maybe at the national and international level, just to make sure that we don't do something very foolish." Musk described the creation of AI as "summoning the demon".

Despite this, Musk was formerly co-chairman of OpenAI and invested in DeepMind, an AI firm, and Vicarious, a company working to improve machine intelligence. In January 2015, he donated $10 million to the nonprofit Future of Life Institute, an organization focused on challenges posed by advanced technologies.

Musk has said that his investments are "not from the standpoint of actually trying to make any investment return... I like to just keep an eye on what's going on with artificial intelligence. I think there is potentially a dangerous outcome there. There have been movies about this, you know, like Terminator. There are some scary outcomes. And we should try to make sure the outcomes are good, not bad."

Musk's opinions about AI have provoked controversy and have been criticized by experts such as Yann LeCun, who claimed Musk's panic was influenced by reading Nick Bostrom's book Superintelligence, and by Musk's attraction to the idea that he will save humanity. Facebook's head of AI Jerome Pesenti said that Musk "has no idea what he's talking about when he talks about AI." He noted that Musk's comments about a future machine takeover distracts people from real, immediate AI concerns, such as AI algorithms exacerbating inequality. Consequently, according to CNBC, Musk is "not always looked upon favorably" by the AI research community. Mark Zuckerberg has clashed with Musk on the issue and called his AI warnings "pretty irresponsible".

In 2016, when asked whether he thinks humans live in a computer simulation, perhaps controlled by a vast AI, Musk stated that "the odds that we're in 'base reality' is one in billions." Harvard physicist Lisa Randall disputes this and has argued the probability of our living in a simulation is "effectively zero".

The Information Technology and Innovation Foundation (ITIF), a Washington, D.C. think-tank, awarded its Annual Luddite Award to "alarmists touting an artificial intelligence apocalypse"; its president, Robert D. Atkinson, complained that Musk and others say AI is the largest existential threat to humanity. Atkinson stated "That's not a very winning message if you want to get AI funding out of Congress to the National Science Foundation." Nature, referring to the award, said that "concerns over AI are not simply fear-mongering" and concluded: "It is crucial that progress in technology is matched by solid, well-funded research to anticipate the scenarios it could bring about ... If that is a Luddite perspective, then so be it." Facebook's AI head, Jerome Pesenti, said that Musk has "no idea what he is talking about when he talks about AI", with CNBC reporting that Musk is "not always looked upon favorably" by the AI research community.

Public transport 
 
At a Tesla event on the sidelines of the Conference on Neural Information Processing Systems in December 2017, Musk stated that:

I think public transport is painful. It sucks. Why do you want to get on something with a lot of other people, that doesn't leave where [sic] you want it to leave, doesn't start where you want it to start, doesn't end where you want it to end? And it doesn't go all the time. [...] It's a pain in the ass. That's why everyone doesn't like it. And there's like a bunch of random strangers, one of who might be a serial killer, OK, great. And so that's why people like individualized transport, that goes where you want, when you want.

Afterwards, he dismissed an audience member's response that public transportation functioned effectively in Japan. His comments sparked widespread criticism from both members of the public and transit experts. Urban planning expert Brent Toderian started the hashtag #GreatThingsThatHappenedonTransit which was widely adopted by Twitter users in order to dispel Musk's notion that everybody hated public transport. Yonah Freemark, an urbanist and journalist specializing in planning and transportation, summarized Musk's views on public transport as "It's terrible. You might be killed. Japanese trains are awful. Individualized transport for everyone! Congestion? Induced demand? Climate change impacts? Unwalkable streets? Who cares!"

Jarrett Walker, a public transport expert, said that "Musk's hatred of sharing space with strangers is a luxury (or pathology) that only the rich can afford", referring to the theory that planning a city around the preferences of a minority yields an outcome that usually does not work for the majority. Musk responded with "You're an idiot", later saying "Sorry ... Meant to say 'sanctimonious idiot'." The exchange received a significant amount of media attention and prompted Nobel laureate Paul Krugman to comment on the controversy, saying that "You're an idiot" is "Elon Musk's idea of a cogent argument".

COVID-19 pandemic
Musk has received criticism over his views on and actions related to the COVID-19 pandemic. In early 2020, Musk referred to COVID-19 as a "specific form of the common cold", stated that "the coronavirus panic is dumb", and that the "danger of panic still far exceeds danger of corona imo. If we over-allocate medical resources to corona, it will come at expense of treating other illnesses". Musk has additionally been criticized for tweeting contentious claims on the disease, including that "Kids are essentially immune, but elderly with existing conditions are vulnerable", which he accompanied with a graphic showing that no children had died in Italy by March 15 and for saying "Based on current trends, probably close to zero new cases in US too by end of April." In addition, he promoted articles which suggested that healthcare companies were inflating COVID-19 case numbers for financial reasons, promoted a paper on the benefits of chloroquine that was subsequently widely discredited and pulled down by Google, and retweeted a video calling for an immediate end to social distancing measures, adding "[d]ocs make good points".

When the Alameda County Sheriff ordered all non-essential businesses to shut down, Musk and Tesla initially refused to comply, arguing that vehicle manufacturing and energy infrastructure are critical sectors, citing the U.S. Department of Homeland Security. Musk called the lockdown "fascist" on a Tesla earnings call, stating:
So, the extension of the shelter-in-place, and frankly I would call it forcibly imprisoning people in their homes against all their constitutional rights — my opinion — and erasing people's freedoms in ways that are horrible and wrong, and not why people came to America or built this country.

Musk later sent out numerous tweets opposing mandatory lockdowns such as "FREE AMERICA NOW." On May 11, Musk reopened Tesla's Fremont production line in defiance and violation of Alameda County's orders and tweeted that "Tesla is restarting production today against Alameda County rules. I will be on the line with everyone else. If anyone is arrested, I ask that it only be me." Musk also announced that Tesla would be moving headquarters to Texas or Nevada and that Tesla had filed a lawsuit against Alameda County challenging its "shutdown" of the Fremont factory; the suit was subsequently withdrawn. The Alameda County Public Health Department explained it was waiting on a plan that Tesla had promised to provide on May 11 that would walk through how it would protect workers' health during the COVID-19 pandemic. An opening date of Monday, May 18 had been penciled in for Tesla pending approval — the same date that Fiat Chrysler, Ford Motor Company, and General Motors were also due to restart production.

In March 2020, in response to a request to repurpose the Tesla factory to make urgently-needed ventilators, Musk promised that Tesla would make ventilators "if there is a shortage". When Nate Silver responded that there was a current shortage, Musk replied, "Ventilators are not difficult, but cannot be produced instantly. Which hospitals have these shortages you speak of right now?" After figures such as New York City mayor Bill de Blasio highlighted their hospitals' ventilator shortage and responded to Musk's offer, Musk said he thought the ventilators which Tesla was working on would probably be unneeded. A week later, Musk tweeted, "We will give away all our ventilators, whether we buy them or build them." He received widespread requests from dignitaries around the world, including the Ukrainian Health minister, Bolivia's Ambassador for Science and Technology to Silicon Valley, and Nigeria's Ministry of Finance. When asked about what they received from Musk, California hospital representatives noted that they received CPAP machines made by ResMed instead and not "full ventilators," though they expressed gratitude nonetheless.

On November 16, 2020, the phrase "Space Karen" began to trend on Twitter after a scientist referred to Musk as such over comments he made questioning the effectiveness of COVID-19 testing and suggested he "didn't read up on the test" before complaining. Musk was also accused by virologist Angela Rasmussen of spreading misinformation about the virus. On November 14, he wrote on Twitter that he had "most likely" contracted COVID-19, referring to the virus as "a type of cold". In December 2020, Politico named Musk's prediction that there would be "close to zero new cases" of COVID-19 by April one of "the most audacious, confident and spectacularly incorrect prognostications about the year".

In December 2022, Musk tweeted "My pronouns are Prosecute/Fauci", which drew responses from US lawmakers. In February 2023, he praised anti-vaxx comments made by Woody Harrelson during Saturday Night Live.

Patents

Elon Musk has been consistently critical of patents, which according to him "serve merely to stifle progress, entrench the positions of giant corporations and enrich those in the legal profession, rather than the actual inventors." 
Under Musk's leadership, Tesla, Inc has opened its patents to being used by competitors.

Conspiracy theories
In August 2020, Musk promoted the unproven theory claiming that aliens built the Egyptian pyramids. Egypt's Minister of International Co-operation Rania Al-Mashat replied to these claims by inviting him to the country to see for himself and implored him to look at further evidence about the construction. Zahi Hawass, Egyptian archaeologist, dismissed his claims, calling it a "complete hallucination". Musk later tweeted a BBC article, writing "This BBC article provides a sensible summary for how it was done."

In November 2022, Musk shared a tweet with an article from a right-wing fake news website which promoted a conspiracy theory that the attack on Paul Pelosi was the result of a drunken Pelosi fighting with a male prostitute.

Space 
Elon Musk has long been an advocate for Space Colonization, especially the Colonization of Mars. As early as 2001, Elon became involved with the nonprofit Mars Society and has repeatedly pushed for humanity colonizing Mars on the basis that said colonization would make humanity an interplanetary species which would lower the risks of human extinction, although shortly after in 2002 he left the Mars Society and began focusing on his own initiatives. Because of this, one of SpaceX's initiatives is the SpaceX Mars program which has primarily focused on vehicle concepts for delivering payloads and crews to Mars.

Economic

Short-selling 
Musk, a longtime opponent of short-selling, has repeatedly criticized the practice and argued it should be illegal. He has engaged with short-selling critics via social media and used Tesla merchandise as a means of mocking those who short the Tesla stock. In lighter moments, Musk has openly joked with well-known short-seller David Einhorn using puns on "short" and arranged to sell commemorative short shorts on Tesla's website for $69.42.

Subsidies 

On the topic of subsidizing companies, Musk has stated that he does not believe the U.S. government should provide subsidies to companies but should instead use a carbon tax to price in the negative externality of climate change and discourage poor behavior. Musk says that the free market would achieve the best solution, and that producing environmentally unfriendly vehicles should come with its own consequences. Musk has acquired large subsidies in the past.

Other

Destiny and religion 
When asked whether he believed "there was some kind of destiny involved" in humanity's transition to a multi-planetary species, rather than "just physics", Musk responded:
Well, I do. Do I think that there's some sort of master intelligence architecting all of this stuff? I think probably not because then you have to say: "Where does the master intelligence come from?" So it sort of begs the question. So I think really you can explain this with the fundamental laws of physics. You know it's [a] complex phenomenon from simple elements.

When asked whether he thought science and religion could co-exist, Musk replied "Probably not."

Regarding SpaceX's Dragon capsule successfully splash landing into the Gulf of Mexico in 2020, Musk said that "You know, I'm not very religious but I prayed for this one".

In an interview with Christian conservative satirical website The Babylon Bee in December 2021, Musk said that "I agree with the principles that Jesus advocated. There's some great wisdom in the teachings of Jesus, and I agree with those teachings."

Wikipedia
Musk has described the Wikipedia entry about him as "insane" and complained that it was a "war zone with a zillion edits." He has also encouraged his Twitter followers to "trash" the page, which led to the article being locked.

In April 2022, Musk tweeted: "They say history is written by the victors, but not on Wikipedia if the losing party is still alive & has lots of time on their hands!", likely referring to Tesla co-founder Martin Eberhard, who is listed on Wikipedia as one of Tesla's two co-founders.

In December 2022, Musk responded to the December 15, 2022 Twitter suspensions Wikipedia entry—once named "Thursday Night Massacre"—by saying, "A two day suspension of maybe 7 accounts for doxxing got an actual Wikipedia page!? Wikipedia is controlled by the MSM [mainstream media] journalists. Can’t trust that site anymore." In response, the Wikimedia Foundation changed a message appealing for donations to "Wikipedia is not for sale… Being a non-profit means there is no danger that someone will buy Wikipedia and turn it into their personal playground', likely referring to Musk's acquisition of Twitter. He said on the same day, "Wikipedia is overly controlled by mainstream media".

References

American exceptionalism
Discrimination against transgender people
Elon Musk
Musk, Elon
Musk, Elon